Nototriton, commonly referred to as moss salamanders is a genus in the salamander family Plethodontidae, which is characterized by their absence of lungs; they instead achieve respiration through their skin and the tissues lining their mouth. They range from Central Costa Rica to north-central and western Honduras reaching also to eastern Guatemala.

Species
The genus contains the following 20 species:

References

External links
 . 2007. Amphibian Species of the World: an Online Reference. Version 5.2 (15 July 2008). Nototriton. Electronic Database accessible at http://research.amnh.org/herpetology/amphibia/index.php. American Museum of Natural History, New York, USA. (Accessed: August 1, 2008).
  [web application]. 2008. Berkeley, California: Nototriton. AmphibiaWeb, available at http://amphibiaweb.org/. (Accessed: August 1, 2008).

 
Amphibian genera
Taxa named by David B. Wake
Taxonomy articles created by Polbot